Rosemary Fadljevic (born 17 September 1993) is an Australian basketball player for the Dandenong Rangers in the Women's National Basketball League.

Career

WNBL
Fadljevic began her professional career in 2011, for the Australian Institute of Sport. Fadljevic has spent time with several WNBL teams in her young career. After the AIS, Fadljevic was signed by her home town club, the Dandenong Rangers. After a one-season stint with the Rangers, Fadljevic travelled north to play with the Townsville Fire. In her second season with the Fire, she took home her first WNBL championship alongside the likes of Suzy Batkovic. She then signed with the Canberra Capitals for the 2015–16 season. For the 2016–17 season, she returned to Victoria, home to the Rangers.

National team

Youth Level
Fadljevic made her international debut at the inaugural FIBA Oceania Under-16 Championship in Brisbane, Australia, where she helped Australia take home gold and qualify for the world championship. Fadljevic would then go on to participate in the inaugural 2010 Summer Youth Olympics in Singapore, in the girls 3x3 basketball event, where Australia placed in second, taking home silver.

References

1993 births
Living people
Australian Institute of Sport basketball (WNBL) players
Australian women's basketball players
Basketball players at the 2010 Summer Youth Olympics
Forwards (basketball)
20th-century Australian women
21st-century Australian women
People from Dandenong, Victoria
Basketball players from Melbourne
Sportswomen from Victoria (Australia)